The Institute of Theology of the Estonian Evangelical Lutheran Church (or ) is a private university in Tallinn, Estonia, established in 1946. It is situated next to the Church of the Holy Spirit, Tallinn.

See also
List of universities in Estonia

External links

Universities and colleges in Estonia
Educational institutions established in 1946
Education in Tallinn
1940s establishments in Estonia
Religious organizations based in Estonia
1946 establishments in the Soviet Union